There are several structures named Cloghan Castle, all in Ireland:

Cloghan Castle in County Cork
Cloghan Castle in County Offaly
Loughrea Castle (also known as Cloghan Castle) in County Galway